The 2003 Women's Pan-American Volleyball Cup was the second edition of the annual women's volleyball tournament, played by eight countries from Monday June 30 to Saturday July 5, 2003 in Saltillo, Coahuila, Mexico. The intercontinental event served as a qualifier for the 2004 FIVB World Grand Prix.

Competing nations

Squads

Preliminary round

Group A

Monday June 30, 2003

Tuesday July 1, 2003

Wednesday July 2, 2003

Group B

Monday June 30, 2003

Tuesday July 1, 2003

Wednesday July 2, 2003

Classification round
Thursday July 3, 2003
Seventh-place match

Classification Matches

Final round

Friday July 4, 2003
Fifth-place match

Semi-finals

Saturday July 5, 2003
Bronze-medal match

Gold-medal match

Final ranking

United States, Dominican Republic, Cuba and Brazil qualified for the 2004 World Grand Prix

Individual awards

Most Valuable Player

Best Attacker

Best Blocker

Best Defender

Best Libero

Best Receiver

Best Server

Best Setter

References

 results
 AVCA

Women's Pan-American Volleyball Cup
Pan-American Volleyball Cup
P
Volleyball
2003 in Mexican women's sports